Hope Springs Eternal is a phrase from the Alexander Pope poem An Essay on Man.

Hope Springs Eternal  may also refer to:

Books
 Hope Springs Eternal, a novel by Edward O. Phillips
 Prairie River: Hope Springs Eternal, a 2005 book by Kristiana Gregory
 Hope Springs Eternal, the subtitle of the 1982 Stephen King novella Rita Hayworth and Shawshank Redemption

Film
 Hope Springs Eternal (film), 2018
 "Hope Springs Eternal", an episode of Project Runway Canada (season 2)
 "Hope Springs Eternal", an episode of the television series Pilot Season

Music
 Hope Springs Eternal, a 1997 album by the band The Echoing Green
 "Hope Springs Eternal", a piano piece by Bruce Barth
 "Hope Springs Eternal", a single by the band The Sandkings
 "Hope Springs Eternal", a track from Hearts in Motion by Air Supply
 "Hope Springs Eternal", a track from Power of Eternity by Wishbone Ash
 "Hope Springs Eternal", a track from If You Want to Defeat Your Enemy Sing His Song by The Icicle Works
 "Hope Springs Eternal", a track from Reason & Madness by Hanging Doll
 Hope Springs Eternal, a 2022 EP by the band "минута агонии"

See also
Hope Springs (disambiguation)